Edward Darrell (by 1523 – 25 June 1573), of Newtimber, Sussex, was an English politician.

He was a Member (MP) of the Parliament of England for Plympton Erle in 1547.

References

1573 deaths
Members of the Parliament of England for Plympton Erle
English MPs 1547–1552
People from Newtimber
Year of birth uncertain